Massimiliana Landini Aleotti (born August 7, 1942) is an Italian billionaire heiress, the owner (with her two children) of the pharmaceutical company Menarini based in Florence, Tuscany, Italy, and one of the world's ten richest women.

As of February 2016, Forbes estimated her net worth at US$11.6 billion.

Her daughter Lucia is chairman of Menarini, and son Alberto Giovanni is vice chairman.

References

Living people
Female billionaires
Italian billionaires
Italian businesspeople
Year of birth uncertain
1942 births